Benenitra is a town in Atsimo-Andrefana Region, Madagascar. It is situated in the district with the same name: Benenitra (district).

On 27 July 2018 a meteriote of an age of 4.56 billion years crushed at Benenitra.

Mining
There are coal deposits at 15km from Benenitra which have not been mined.

Geography
Benenitra is situated at the Onilahy River and on the National Road T 17 A.

References

Populated places in Atsimo-Andrefana